"Hippy Hippy Shake" is a song written and recorded by Chan Romero in 1959. That same year, it reached No. 3 in Australia. Romero was 17 years old when he wrote the song.

Personnel
 Chan Romero – guitar, vocals
 Barney Kessel – rhythm guitar
 Irving Ashby – upright bass
 Rene Hall – Danelectro bass guitar
 Earl Palmer – drums

The Beatles version 

A live version of "Hippy Hippy Shake" can be found on The Beatles album Live at the BBC. That version was recorded in July 1963, almost certainly pre-dating The Swinging Blue Jeans recording. The Beatles also played the song in their early days when they performed in small clubs. It is included on Live! At the Star-Club, Hamburg 1962. Another version, recorded on 10 September 1963 for "Pop Go The Beatles", can be found on On Air – Live at the BBC Volume 2. The Beatles also revisited the song during the sessions for the Let It Be album and film in January 1969. That version is currently unreleased but is available on various bootleg recordings.

Personnel 
 Paul McCartney – vocals, bass
 John Lennon – rhythm guitar
 George Harrison – lead guitar
 Ringo Starr – drums

Other cover versions
A cover version by Italian rocker Little Tony appeared in the same year and found moderate success in the UK and Italy.

A version by UK-based band The Swinging Blue Jeans was released in December 1963. This single reached No. 2 in the UK Singles Chart and No. 24 in the US charts in early 1964. The song became their biggest hit in both the UK and the US. With this song the Swinging Blue Jeans became one of the earliest British acts to chart in the US during the British Invasion, following The Beatles, Dusty Springfield, and The Dave Clark Five, and debuting the same week as The Searchers.

The song was covered by the glam rock band Mud in 1974, being released on their album Mud Rock which reached No. 8 in the UK Albums Chart.

British garage rock musician Billy Childish and his band The Milkshakes also recorded a cover on their 1984 album 20 Rock And Roll Hits of the 50s and 60s.

The song was also covered by Davy Jones in 1987 as the B-side of his single "After Your Heart".

The song was also covered by the band The Georgia Satellites in 1988. That same year, it reached the Billboard Hot 100 (No. 45) and the Mainstream Rock Chart (No. 13).

In popular culture
The song was included in the films The Men Who Stare at Goats, X-Men: First Class, Uncle Buck, and Austin Powers: International Man of Mystery. The cover version by The Georgia Satellites is featured in the films Cocktail, Angels in the Outfield and It Takes Two as well as an episode of The Simpsons.

In 1979, The B-52's song "Dance This Mess Around", which featured numerous 1960s pop culture references, repeated the line, "Hippy hippy forward hippy hippy hippy hippy hippy shake", an allusion to this song.

In the Full House episode "The House Meets the Mouse", the fictional band Jesse and the Rippers performed this song live at Walt Disney World. In 2013, Jesse and the Rippers again performed this song on Late Night with Jimmy Fallon as part of their one night only reunion.

The song is played on the radio in season 9's Christmas Special of "Call the Midwife."

References

1959 singles
1963 singles
1988 singles
The Beatles songs
Number-one singles in Norway
The Georgia Satellites songs
1959 songs
Imperial Records singles
His Master's Voice singles
Songs about dancing
Novelty songs